This list of the Mesozoic life of Alaska contains the various prehistoric life-forms whose fossilized remains have been reported from within the US state of Alaska and are between 252.17 and 66 million years of age.

A

 Acila
  †Actinoceramus
 †Actinoceramus concentricus
 †Actinoceramus sulcatus
  †Alaskacephale – type locality for genus
 †Alaskacephale gangloffi – type locality for species
 †Allocotidus – type locality for genus
 †Allocotidus bruesi – type locality for species
 †Alpinophyllia
 †Alpinophyllia flexuosa
  †Amaltheus
 †Amblydactylus
 †Amblysiphonella
 †Amoeboceras
 †Ampakabastraea
 †Ampakabastraea cowichanensis
 †Ampakabastraea nodosa – or unidentified comparable form
  Amusium
 †Anagaudryceras
 †Anagaudryceras auranium
 †Anagaudryceras aurarium
 †Anagaudryceras inflatus
 †Anagaudryceras sacya – type locality for species
  †Anapachydiscus
 †Anapachydiscus nelchinensis – type locality for species
 †Anatomites
 †Anatomites externiplicatus
 †Anatomites septentrionalis – type locality for species
 †Andangularia
 †Andangularia wilsoni – type locality for species
  †Anomia
 †Anoptychia – tentative report
 †Anthostylis
 †Anthostylis acanthophora
 †Antiquilima – tentative report
 †Aopullina – tentative report
 †Aquilapollenites
 †Aquilapollenites decorus
 †Aquilapollenites fusiformis
 †Aquilapollenites quadrilobus
 †Aquilapollenites reticulatus
 †Aquilapollenites scabridus
  †Arcestes
  †Archaeocidaris – tentative report
 †Archaeodictyomitra
 †Archaeodictyomitra exigua – type locality for species
 †Archaeospongoprunum
 †Archaeospongoprunum helense – type locality for species
 †Arcthoplites
 †Arcthoplites belli
 †Arcthoplites talkeetnanus
 Arctica – tentative report
  †Arcticoceras
 †Arctocephalites
 †Arctocephalites alticostus
 †Arctocephalites costidensus – type locality for species
 †Arctocephalites pompeckji
 †Arctoceras
 †Arctoceras blomstrandi
 †Arctoceras tuberculatum
 †Arctoceras tuberculatus
 †Arctopteris
 †Arctopteris kolymensis – or unidentified related form
 †Arctopteris rarinervis
 †Areaseris
 †Areaseris nevadensis
 †Arieticeras
 †Arieticeras domarense – or unidentified related form
  †Arnioceras
 †Arnioceras arnouldi – or unidentified comparable form
 †Arpadites – tentative report
 †Aspenites
 †Aspenites acutus
 Astarte
 †Astarte carlottensis
 †Asthenoceras
 †Asthenoceras nannodes – or unidentified related form
 †Astraeomorpha
 †Astraeomorpha confusa
 †Astraeomorpha crassisepta
 †Astrocoenia – tentative report
 †Atractites
 †Atreta
 †Aucella
 †Aucella okensis
 †Aucella spitiensis
 †Aucella subokensis
 †Aucellina
 Avicula
 †Avicula soperi
  †Aviculopecten
 †Azonia
 †Azonia cribrata
 †Azonia pulchella
 †Azonia strictiparva

B

     †Baculites
 †Baculites occidentalis
 †Badouxia
 †Badouxia canadensis
 †Badouxia columbiae
 †Bathysiphon
 †Belemnites
 †Betraccium
 †Betraccium perilense – or unidentified related form
 †Bipedis
 †Bipedis acrostylus
 †Biplica
 †Birisia
 †Birisia alata
 †Birisia ochotica
 †Birisia oerstedtii – or unidentified comparable form
 †Bisulcocypridea
 †Bositra
 †Bositra buchi – or unidentified comparable form
 †Bradfordia
 †Bradfordia oppeliiformis – type locality for species
 †Brewericeras
 †Brewericeras breweri
 †Brewericeras hulenense
 †Brewericeras hulense – or unidentified comparable form
 †Buchia
 †Buchia bronni – or unidentified comparable form
 †Buchia concentrica
 †Buchia crassicolis
 †Buchia crassicollis
 †Buchia fischeriana – or unidentified related form
 †Buchia keyserlingi
 †Buchia mosquensis
 †Buchia pacifica
 †Buchia pallasi – or unidentified comparable form
 †Buchia piochii
 †Buchia rugosa
 †Buchia solida
 †Buchia sublaevis
 †Bullatimorphites
 †Bullatimorphites varicostatum – type locality for species

C

  †Cadoceras
 †Cadoceras bathomphalum – type locality for species
 †Cadoceras catostoma
 †Cadoceras chinitnense – type locality for species
 †Cadoceras comma – type locality for species
 †Cadoceras crassicostatum – type locality for species
 †Cadoceras doroschini
 †Cadoceras glabrum – type locality for species
 †Cadoceras grewingki
 †Cadoceras kialagvikense – type locality for species
 †Cadoceras petelini
 †Cadoceras schmidti
 †Cadoceras tenuicostatum – type locality for species
 †Cadoceras wosnessenskii
   †Calliphylloceras
 †Calliphylloceras aldersoni – or unidentified comparable form
 †Calliphylloceras freibrocki – type locality for species
 †Calliphylloceras nizinanum – type locality for species
 †Callistopollenites
 †Callistopollenites radiostriatus
 †Callizoniceras
 †Callospiriferina
 †Callospiriferina tumida
  †Calycoceras
 †Camptonectes
 †Camptonectes dettermani
 †Canadoceras
 †Canadoceras kossmati – or unidentified comparable form
 †Canadoceras newberryanum
 †Canadoceras yokoyamai
 †Candonopsis – tentative report
 †Canutus – tentative report
 †Canutus ingrahamensis
 †Capnuchosphaera
 †Capnuchosphaera deweveri – or unidentified related form
 †Capnuchosphaera lenticulata – or unidentified related form
 †Capnuchosphaera mexicana
 †Capnuchosphaera schenki
 †Capnuchosphaera smithorum
 †Capnuchosphaera theoloides – or unidentified related form
 †Capnuchosphaera tricornis
   Capulus – tentative report
 Cardinia
 Cardita – tentative report
 †Cassianella
 †Cassianella cordillerana – type locality for species
 †Cassianella gravinaensis – type locality for species
 †Cassianella lingulata
 †Cavussurella
 †Cavussurella grammi – type locality for species
 †Cedriplites
 †Cedriplites canadensis
  †Cenoceras
 †Cenoceras imlayi – type locality for species
 †Cephalotaxopsis
 †Cephalotaxopsis intermedia
  †Ceratites
 †Cercomya – tentative report
 †Ceriostella
 †Ceriostella martini
 †Ceriostella parva
  Cerithium – tentative report
 †Chandlerichthys – type locality for genus
 †Chandlerichthys strickeri – type locality for species
 †Chinitnites
 †Chinitnites parviformus – type locality for species
  Chlamys
 †Choffatia
  †Chondrites – tentative report
 †Chondrites heeri – or unidentified comparable form
 †Chondrocoenia
 †Chondrocoenia paradoxa – or unidentified comparable form
 †Chonetes – tentative report
 †Christitys
 †Christitys martini – type locality for species
 †Chulitnacula
 †Chulitnacula alaskana – type locality for species
  Cidaris – tentative report
 †Cimolodon
  Cladophlebis
 †Cladophlebis hirta – tentative report
 †Claraia
 †Claraia stachei
  †Cleoniceras
 †Cleoniceras overbecki – type locality for species
 †Clionitites – tentative report
 †Cobbanites
 †Cobbanites talkeetnanus
 †Coccophyllum
 †Collonia
 †Collonia occidentalis – or unidentified comparable form
 †Coniopteris
 †Coniopteris arctica - or unidentified loosely related form
 †Coniopteris saportana
 †Conucardia
 †Corum
 †Corum perfectum
 †Corum regium
 †Corum speciosum
 †Cosmonautilus – tentative report
 †Costispiriferina
 †Costispiriferina pittensis – or unidentified related form
 †Covracythere
 †Covracythere binoda – type locality for species
 †Covracythere gryci – type locality for species
 †Cranwellia
 †Cranwellia rumseyensis
 †Cranwellia striata
 †Crassistella
 †Crassistella juvavica
 †Crassistella parvula
 †Crassistella vesiculosa – or unidentified comparable form
 †Crenipecten – tentative report
 †Crenipecten crenulatus – or unidentified comparable form
 †Crucella
 †Crucella magna – type locality for species
 †Ctenis
 †Ctenophyllum
 †Ctenophyllum angustifolim – tentative report
 †Cuifia
 †Cuifia marmorea – or unidentified comparable form
 †Curtoseris
 †Curtoseris dunlapcanyonae
 †Cyathocoenia
 †Cycloceltites
 †Cycloceltites arduini – or unidentified comparable form
 †Cylindroteuthis
 †Cypridea
 †Cyrtia
 †Cyrtina – report made of unidentified related form or using admittedly obsolete nomenclature

D

   †Dactylioceras
 †Dactylioceras commune – or unidentified comparable form
 †Dactylioceras kanense
 †Dagyspirifer – type locality for genus
 †Dagyspirifer fascicostata – type locality for species
 †Damesites
 †Damesites hetonaiensis
  †Daonella
 †Daxatina
 †Daxatina canadensis – or unidentified comparable form
 Dentalina
  †Dentalium
 †Desmiophyllum
 †Desmiophyllum magnum
 †Desmiophyllum spp.
  †Desmoceras
 †Desmoceras japonicum
 †Desmophyllites
 †Desmophyllites diphylloides
 †Dettermania
 †Dettermania truncata – type locality for species
 Dicotylophyllum
 †Dicotylophyllum spp.
 †Dictyophyllum
 †Dictyophyllum nilssoni
  †Didymoceras
 †Didymoceras hornbyense – or unidentified related form
 †Dielasma – tentative report
 †Dielasma chapini – type locality for species
 †Dieneroceras
 †Dieneroceras dieneri
 †Dimyodon
 †Dimyodon storrsi
 †Diplomoceras
 †Diplomoceras notabile
 †Diplomoceras notable
 †Discamphiceras
 †Discamphiceras reissi – or unidentified related form
 †Discamphiceras silberlingi – or unidentified comparable form
 †Discophyllites
 †Discophyllites patens
 †Discotropites
 †Discotropites davisi
 †Discotropites mojsvarensis
 †Discotropites sandlingensis
 †Distichomeandra
 †Distichomeandra austriaca
 †Distichomeandra minor
 †Distichophyllia
 †Distichophyllia marmorea
 †Distichophyllia melnikovae – type locality for species
 †Distichophyllia norica
 Ditrupa
 †Ditrupa cornu – type locality for species
 †Divatella
 †Divatella robinsoni – type locality for species
 †Docidoceras
 †Docidoceras camachoi – type locality for species
 †Docidoceras longalvum – or unidentified related form
 †Docidoceras paucinodosum – type locality for species
 †Docidoceras widebayense – type locality for species
  †Douvilleiceras
 †Douvilleiceras mammillatum
 †Dromaeosaurus
 †Dromaeosaurus albertensis

E

  †Edmontonia
   †Edmontosaurus – or unidentified related form
 †Edmontosaurus saskatchewanensis
 †Eleganticeras
 †Eleganticeras exaratum – or unidentified comparable form
 †Ellisonia
 †Ellisonia triassica
 †Elymella – tentative report
 †Elymella nuculoides – or unidentified comparable form
 †Elysastraea
 †Elysastraea profunda
 †Elysastraea vancouverensis
 †Enantigonathus
 †Enantigonathus mungoensis
 †Enantigonathus ziegleri
 †Entolium
 †Entolium utukokense – type locality for species
 †Entolium yukonensis – type locality for species
 †Entollum
 †Eocomoseris
 †Eocomoseris ramosa
 †Eogunnarites
 †Eogunnarites alaskaensis
 †Eogunnarites alaskensis
 †Eolytoceras
 †Eolytoceras tasekoi – or unidentified comparable form
 †Eopecten – tentative report
 †Epigondolella
 †Epigondolella bidentata – or unidentified comparable form
 †Eptingium
 †Eptingium manfredi – or unidentified comparable form
 †Equisetites
 †Equisetites burejensis
 †Erdtmanipollis
 †Erdtmanipollis procumbentiformis
 †Erycites
 †Erycites howelli
 †Euaptetoceras
 †Euaptetoceras amplectens
 †Euaptetoceras nucleospinosum – or unidentified related form
  †Eubostrychoceras
 †Eubostrychoceras japonicum – or unidentified comparable form
 †Eudmetoceras
 †Eudmetoceras eudmetum – or unidentified related form
 †Euflemingites
 †Euflemingites cirratus
 †Euflemingites romunderi
 †Eumorphotis
 †Eumorphotis nationalis – type locality for species
 †Euomphaloceras
  †Euomphalus
 †Euphyllites – tentative report

F

 †Faguspollenites
 †Faguspollenites granulatus
 †Fanninoceras
 †Fanninoceras carlottense
 †Fanninoceras fannini
 †Fanninoceras maudense – or unidentified comparable form
 †Ferresium
 †Fibulapollis
 †Fissirhynchia
 †Fissirhynchia fissicostata
 †Flaventia – tentative report
 †Flaventia kukpowrukensis – type locality for species
 †Franziceras – tentative report
 †Freboldiceras – type locality for genus
 †Freboldiceras singulare – type locality for species
 †Fresvillia
 †Fresvillia teres – or unidentified related form

G

 †Gabbioceras
 †Gablonzeria
 †Gablonzeria grandiosa
 †Gablonzeria major
 †Gablonzeria profunda
  †Gaudryceras
 †Gaudryceras denseplicatum – or unidentified related form
 †Gaudryceras hobetsense
 †Gaudryceras tenuiliratum
 †Gavellinella
 †Gavellinella velascoensis – or unidentified comparable form
 †Germanonautilus
 †Germanonautilus brooksi – type locality for species
  †Gervillia
 †Gervillia spp.
 Ginkgo
  †Ginkgo adiantoides - or unidentified loosely related form
 †Ginkgo concinna - or unidentified loosely related form
 Gleichenia
 †Gleichenia pseudocrenata – or unidentified comparable form
 †Glossites – tentative report
 †Glossites lingualis – or unidentified comparable form
 †Goniomya – tentative report
 †Gonodon – tentative report
 †Gowericeras
 †Gowericeras snugharborense – type locality for species
 †Gowericeras spinosum – type locality for species
 †Grammatodon
 †Grantziceras
 †Grantziceras affine
 †Grantziceras glabrum
  †Gryphaea
 †Gryphaea arcuataeformis
 †Gryphaea arcusta – or unidentified comparable form
 †Gryphaea cymbium – or unidentified comparable form
 †Gryphaea impressimarginata
 †Gryphaea keilhaui – or unidentified comparable form
 †Gryphaea rockymontana
 †Gulielmiceras
 †Gulielmiceras alaskanum – type locality for species
 Guttulina
 †Gymnocodium
 †Gymnocodium bellerophontis
 †Gypsonictops – or unidentified comparable form
 Gyroidinoides

H

 †Halobia
 †Halobia alaskana – type locality for species
 †Halobia austriaca
 †Halobia brooksi – type locality for species
 †Halobia cordillerana
 †Halobia dalliana – type locality for species
 †Halobia dilatata
 †Halobia distincta
 †Halobia fallax
 †Halobia halorica
 †Halobia lineata
 †Halobia ornatissima
 †Halobia septentrionalis – type locality for species
 †Halobia superba
 †Halobia sustriaca
 †Halobia symmetrica – type locality for species
 †Halomitra – report made of unidentified related form or using admittedly obsolete nomenclature
 †Halomitra triadica
 †Halorella – tentative report
 †Halorites
 †Hamulus – tentative report
 †Hannaoceras – tentative report
 Haplophragmoides
 †Hauerites
 †Healdia
 †Hebetoxyites
 †Hebetoxyites hebes – or unidentified related form
 †Heilungia
 †Heilungia oloensis – or unidentified comparable form
 †Heptastylis
   †Hesperornis
  †Heterastridium
 †Heterastridium conglobatum
 Heteropora
 †Hiatobairdia
 †Hiatobairdia arcuata
 †Higumastra
 †Higumastra transversa – type locality for species
 †Hildaites – tentative report
 †Himavatites – tentative report
 †Himavatites multiauritis – or unidentified comparable form
 †Holcophylloceras
 †Holcophylloceras costisparsum
 †Hoplotropites
 †Hoplotropites jokelyi – or unidentified comparable form
 †Hsuum – tentative report
 †Hsuum inexploratum – type locality for species
 †Hulenites
 †Hulenites reesidei – or unidentified comparable form
 †Hypophylloceras
 †Hypophylloceras californicatus – or unidentified comparable form
 †Hypophylloceras californicum – or unidentified comparable form

I

 †Iniskinites
 †Iniskinites abruptus – type locality for species
 †Iniskinites intermedius – type locality for species
 †Iniskinites magniformus
 †Iniskinites martini – type locality for species
  †Inoceramus
 †Inoceramus comancheanus
 †Inoceramus cuvieri – or unidentified comparable form
 †Inoceramus elegans – or unidentified related form
 †Inoceramus eximius
 †Inoceramus hobetsensis – or unidentified related form
 †Inoceramus mamatensis – or unidentified related form
 †Inoceramus naumanni – or unidentified comparable form
 †Inoceramus porrectus – or unidentified comparable form
 †Inoceramus schmidti
 †Inoceramus subundatus – or unidentified comparable form
 †Inoceramus teshioensis – or unidentified related form
 †Inoceramus yokoyamai – or unidentified comparable form
 †Integricorpus
  †Isastrea – tentative report
 Isocrinus
 †Isocrinus gravinse
 †Isocyprina – tentative report
  Isognomon – tentative report

J

 †Joannites
 †Juvavites
 †Juvavites knowltoni
 †Juvavites magnus – or unidentified comparable form
 †Juvavites subinterruptus
 †Juvenites
 †Juvenites septentrionalis

K

 †Kammerkarites
 †Kammerkarites frigga – or unidentified comparable form
 †Kammerkarites megastoma - or unidentified loosely related form
 †Kenella
 †Kenella filatovii
 †Kennicottia – type locality for genus
 †Kennicottia bifurcata – type locality for species
 †Kennicottia rugosa – type locality for species
  †Kepplerites
 †Kompsasteria
 †Kompsasteria oligocystis – or unidentified comparable form
  †Kosmoceras
  †Kosmoceras spinosum – or unidentified comparable form
 †Kuhnastraea
 †Kuhnastraea decussata
 †Kuhnastraea incrassata – type locality for species
 †Kukaspis – type locality for genus
 †Kukaspis usingeri – type locality for species

L

 †Laballa
 †Laballa suessi
 †Lanceolites
 †Lanceolites bicarinatus
 †Lanceolites compactus
 †Latimaeandra – report made of unidentified related form or using admittedly obsolete nomenclature
 †Latimaeandra alaskana
 †Leconteites
 †Leconteites deansi
 †Leconteites deansii
 †Leconteites modestus
 †Lemuroceras
 †Lemuroceras dubium – or unidentified comparable form
 †Leptaleoceras – tentative report
 †Liliacidites
 †Liliacidites variegatus
 †Lilloettia
 †Lilloettia buckmani
 †Lilloettia lilloetensis
 †Lilloettia mertonyarwoodi
 †Lilloettia milleri – type locality for species
 †Lilloettia stantoni – type locality for species
 Lima
 †Lima blackburnei – type locality for species
 †Lima kimballi – or unidentified related form
 †Lima martini – type locality for species
 †Lima spp.
 †Lioceratoides
 †Lioceratoides involutum – or unidentified comparable form
 †Liospiriferina
 †Liospiriferina rostrata
 †Lobites
 †Lobites pacianus – or unidentified comparable form
 †Lobothyris
 †Lobothyris monstrifer – or unidentified comparable form
 †Lobothyris mostrifer – or unidentified comparable form
 †Lobothyris praepunctata
 †Lobothyris punctata – or unidentified comparable form
 †Loranthacites
 †Loranthacites pilatus
 †Lucina
  †Lytoceras
  †Lytoceras eudesianum – or unidentified related form
  †Lytoceras fimbriatum – or unidentified comparable form

M

 †Maclurites – tentative report
 †Macrophylloceras
 †Macrophylloceras grossicostatum
 †Maeandrostylis
 †Maeandrostylis grandiseptus
 †Maeandrostylis vancouverensis
 †Mancicorpus
 †Mancicorpus trapeziforme
 †Maoritrigonia
 †Margarastraea
 †Margarastraea eucystis
 †Margarastraea granissima
  Margarites
 †Margarites moffiti – type locality for species
 †Margaritropites
 †Margaritropites johnsoni
 †Margarosmilia
 †Margarosmilia chalyana – tentative report
 †Margarosmilia charlyana
 †Margarosmilia confluens
 †Margarosmilia richthofeni – or unidentified comparable form
 †Marginotruncana
 †Marginotruncana sigali – or unidentified comparable form
 †Marshallites
 †Marshallites cumshewaensis
 †Meekoceras
 †Meekoceras gracilitatis
 †Meginoceras
 †Meleagrinella
 †Mesochara
 †Mesopuzosia
 †Mesopuzosia indopacifica – or unidentified comparable form
 †Metapolygnathus
 †Metapolygnathus primitius
 †Metasibirites
 †Metussuria
 †Metussuria waageni
 †Microchara
 †Microdoma – tentative report
 †Microreticulatisporites
 †Microreticulatisporites uniformis
 Milax
 †Milax alienus – type locality for species
 †Milax flexuosus – type locality for species
 †Milax inflatus – type locality for species
 †Minetrigonia
 †Minetrigonia cairnesi – or unidentified comparable form
 †Minetrigonia suttonensis
 †Mirella
 †Mirella borealis – or unidentified related form
   †Modiolus
 †Moffiites
 †Moffiites robustus
 †Moffites
 †Moffites robustus
 †Moffitites – type locality for genus
 †Moffitites crassus
 †Moffitites robustus – type locality for species
 †Mojsvaroceras – tentative report
 †Mongolocypris
 †Monotis
 †Monotis alaskana – type locality for species
 †Monotis anjuensis
 †Monotis daonellaeformis
 †Monotis haueri
 †Monotis jakutica
 †Monotis obtusicostata
 †Monotis ochotica
 †Monotis pachypleura
 †Monotis pinensis – tentative report
 †Monotis subcircularis
 †Monotis typica
 †Montlivaltia
 †Montlivaltia martini – type locality for species
 †Muelleritortis
 †Muelleritortis cochleata
 †Mullerites
 †Mullerites pleuroacanthitoides – or unidentified comparable form
  †Muramotoceras
 †Muramotoceras yezoense – or unidentified related form
 †Murchisonia – tentative report
 †Myoconcha
 †Myoconcha nana – or unidentified comparable form
  †Myophorella
 †Myophorella alaskaensis – type locality for species
 †Myophorella argo
 †Myophorella dawsoni
 †Myophorella devexa
 †Myophorella orientalis
 †Myophorella packardi
 †Myophorella tipperi
 †Myophorella tuxedniensis – type locality for species
  †Myophoria
 †Myophoria beringiana – type locality for species
 †Myphoria – tentative report
 †Mytiloceramus
 †Mytiloceramus lucifer
 †Mytiloides
 †Mytiloides stantoni
    †Mytilus

N

   †Nanuqsaurus – type locality for genus
 †Nanuqsaurus hoglundi – type locality for species
 Napora
 †Napora aculeata – type locality for species
 †Napora bukryi – or unidentified comparable form
 †Napora milleri – type locality for species
 †Napora pualensis – type locality for species
 †Nathorstites
 †Nathorstites alaskanus – type locality for species
  Natica
 †Natica spp.
 †Neogondelella
 †Neogondelella jubata
 †Neogondolella
 †Neogondolella navicula
 †Neogondolella silberlingi
 †Neogondolella tozeri
 †Neohimavatites
 †Neohimavatites canadensis – or unidentified comparable form
 †Neophylloceras
 †Neophylloceras hetonaiense
 †Neophylloceras ramosum
 †Neophylloceras seresitense
 †Neospathodus – report made of unidentified related form or using admittedly obsolete nomenclature
 †Neospathodus conservativus
  Nerita – tentative report
 †Neritaria
 †Neritaria nuetzeli – type locality for species
 Neritopsis
 †Nevadathalamia
 †Nevadathalamia cylindrica
 †Nevadathalamia minima – type locality for species
 †Nilsonia
 †Nilsonia decursiva – or unidentified comparable form
 †Nilsonia magnifolia
 †Nilsonia menneri
 †Nilsonia polymorpha
 †Nilsonia serotina – or unidentified comparable form
 Nodosaria
 †Novispathodus
 †Novispathodus waageni
  Nucula
 †Nucula percrassa – or unidentified related form
 Nuculana – tentative report

O

 †Ogmoconcha
 †Ogmoconcha alaskaense – type locality for species
 †Ogmoconcha limbata – or unidentified related form
 †Ogmoconcha marquardti
 †Ogmoconcha owthropensis
 †Ogmoconcha tailleuri – type locality for species
 †Ogmoconcha unicerata – type locality for species
 †Omphaloptycha
 †Onychiopsis
 †Onychiopsis psilotoides – or unidentified comparable form
 †Ophiceras
 †Ophiceras commune
 †Ophiceras greenlandicum – or unidentified comparable form
 †Orbiculiforma
 †Orbiculiforma iniqua – type locality for species
 †Orbiculiforma multifora – or unidentified related form
 †Orbiculiformella – tentative report
 †Orbiculiformella incognita – type locality for species
   Ostrea
 †Otoceras
 †Otoceras boreale
 †Otoscaphites
 †Otoscaphites teshioensis
 †Otozamites
 †Otozamites bornholmiensis – tentative report
 †Otozamites pterophylloides
 †Owenites
 †Owenites koeneni – or unidentified comparable form
  †Oxycerites
 †Oxycerites chinitnana – type locality for species
 †Oxytoma

P

  †Pachydiscus
 †Pachydiscus hazzardi – type locality for species
 †Pachydiscus kamishakensis – type locality for species
 †Pachydiscus obsoletiformis – type locality for species
 †Pachydiscus ootacodensis
     †Pachyrhinosaurus
 †Pachyrhinosaurus perotorum – type locality for species
  †Pagiophyllum
 †Pagiophyllum falcatum
 †Pagiophyllum triangulare
 †Palaeastraea
 †Palaeastraea borealis
 †Palaeastraea descussata
 †Palaeopharus
 †Palaeopharus buriji – or unidentified comparable form
 †Paleosaturnalis
 †Pamiroseris
 †Pamiroseris borealis – type locality for species
 †Pamiroseris meriani
 †Pamiroseris rectilamellosa – or unidentified comparable form
 Panopea
 †Panopea elongatissima – or unidentified comparable form
 †Panopea kissoumi
 †Pantanellium
 †Pantanellium fosteri – or unidentified related form
 †Paracadoceras
 †Paracadoceras chisikense – type locality for species
 †Paracadoceras moffiti – type locality for species
 †Paracadoceras multiforme
 †Paracadoceras tonniense – type locality for species
 †Paracuifia
 †Paracuifia anomala
 †Paracuifia jennieae – type locality for species
 †Paracuifia smithi – type locality for species
 †Paracyclas – tentative report
 †Paracyclas ellipticus – or unidentified comparable form
 †Paradelphinulopsis
 †Paradelphinulopsis vallieri
 †Parallelodon
 †Parallelodon cumshewaensis
 †Parallelodon simillimus
 †Paranannites
 †Paranannites aspenensis
 †Paranannites slossi
 †Parareineckeia
 †Parareineckeia hickersonensis – type locality for species
 †Parareineckeia shelikofana – type locality for species
 †Parasilesites – type locality for genus
 †Parasilesites bullatus – type locality for species
 †Parasilesites irregularis – type locality for species
 †Parastraeomorpha
 †Parastraeomorpha minuscula
 †Parataxodium
 †Parataxodium wigginsii – or unidentified comparable form
 †Paratropites
 †Parauvanella
 †Parauvanella ferdowsensis – or unidentified comparable form
 †Parkinsonia – tentative report
 †Paroecotraustes
 †Paronaella
 †Paronaella bandyi – or unidentified related form
 †Paronaella pessagnoi – type locality for species
 †Paronaella pygmaea – or unidentified related form
 †Paronaella venadoensis – or unidentified related form
 †Paronaella venusta – type locality for species
 †Partschiceras
 †Partschiceras ellipticum – type locality for species
 †Partschiceras grantzi – type locality for species
 †Partschiceras japonicum
 †Partschiceras subobtusiforme
 Parvamussium – report made of unidentified related form or using admittedly obsolete nomenclature
 †Parvicingula
 †Parvicingula blackhornensis
 †Parvicingula praeacutum – type locality for species
 †Parvicingula rothwelli – or unidentified related form
 †Patagiosites
 †Patagiosites alaskensis – type locality for species
 Patella – tentative report
   †Pecten
 †Pecten spp.
 †Pelekodites
 †Pelekodites pelekus – or unidentified comparable form
 †Pentacrinus
  †Peregrinella
 †Peregrinella chisania – type locality for species
 †Peribositria – report made of unidentified related form or using admittedly obsolete nomenclature
 †Peribositria mimer – tentative report
 †Perispyridium
 †Perispyridium alinchakense
 †Perispyridium dettermani
 †Perispyridium nitidum
 †Phacelophyllia – report made of unidentified related form or using admittedly obsolete nomenclature
 †Phacelophyllia suttonensis
 †Phacelostylophyllum
 †Phacelostylophyllum zitteli
 †Phloioceras
 †Phoenicopsis
 †Phoenicopsis angustifolia - or unidentified loosely related form
  Pholadomya
  †Phylloceras
 †Phylloceras bakeri – type locality for species
  †Phyllopachyceras
 †Phyllopachyceras chitinanum – type locality for species
 †Phyllopachyceras forbesianum
 †Phyllopachyceras shastalense – or unidentified comparable form
 †Piarorhynchia – report made of unidentified related form or using admittedly obsolete nomenclature
 †Piarorhynchia hamiltonensis – type locality for species
 †Pinacoceras
 †Pinacoceras rex – or unidentified comparable form
  †Pinna
 †Pinna expansa – or unidentified comparable form
 †Pinnigena
 †Pityolepis – tentative report
 †Pityophyllum
 †Pityophyllum nordenskioldii - or unidentified loosely related form
 †Pityophyllum staratschinii - or unidentified loosely related form
 †Pityostrobus
 †Pityostrobus piceoides – or unidentified comparable form
 †Placites
 †Placunopsis – tentative report
 †Plagiostoma
  †Planolites – tentative report
   Platanus
 †Platanus louravetlanica
  †Platyceras
 †Pleuroacanthites
 †Pleuroacanthites mulleri - or unidentified loosely related form
 †Pleuromya
 †Pleuromya carlottensis
  †Pleuronautilus
 †Pleuronautilus alaskensis – type locality for species
 †Pleurophorus – report made of unidentified related form or using admittedly obsolete nomenclature
 †Pleurophorus overbecki – type locality for species
  Pleurotomaria
 Plicatula
 †Plicatula perimbricata – or unidentified comparable form
 †Plicatula periobricata – or unidentified comparable form
 †Podozamites
 †Podozamites eichwaldii - or unidentified loosely related form
 †Podozamites spp.
 †Polycingulatisporites
 †Polycingulatisporites triangularis
 †Posidonia
 †Poulpus
 †Poulpus transitus
 †Praeparvicingula
 †Praeparvicingula communis – type locality for species
 †Praeparvicingula decora – or unidentified related form
 †Praeparvicingula inornata – type locality for species
 †Praeparvicingula prisca – type locality for species
 †Proarcestes
 †Proarcestes shastensis
 †Procerites
 †Procerites irregularis – type locality for species
 †Procyclolites
 †Projuvavites
 †Projuvavites brockensis
 †Promathildia – tentative report
 †Proptychites
 †Proptychites rosenkrantzei – or unidentified comparable form
 †Protocardia
 †Protocula
 †Protocula bassetti
 †Protorcula
 †Protorcula bassetti – type locality for species
  †Protrachyceras
 †Pseudammatoceras
 †Pseudammatoceras benneri – or unidentified related form
 †Pseudaptetoceras
 †Pseudaptetoceras klimakomphalum
 †Pseudobythocypris
 †Pseudocrucella
 †Pseudocrucella plana – type locality for species
 †Pseudocrucella prava – type locality for species
 †Pseudocycas
 †Pseudodictromitria
 †Pseudodictromitria carpatica
 †Pseudoencurtis
 †Pseudoheliodiscus
 †Pseudoheliodiscus viejoensis
 †Pseudolioceras
 †Pseudolioceras compactile – or unidentified comparable form
 †Pseudolioceras costistriatum – type locality for species
 †Pseudolioceras fastigatum – type locality for species
 †Pseudolioceras lythense – or unidentified comparable form
 †Pseudolioceras whiteavesi
  †Pseudomelania – tentative report
 †Pseudomonotis – tentative report
 †Pseudophyllites
 †Pseudophyllites indra
 †Pseudosageceras
 †Pseudoseptifer
 †Pseudospondylospira – type locality for genus
 †Pseudospondylospira perplexa – type locality for species
 †Pseudostylosphaera
 †Pseudostylosphaera coccostyle
 †Pseudostylosphaera helicatum
 †Pseudostylosphaera japonica
 †Pseudostylosphaera nazarovi
 †Pseudotoites
 †Pseudotoites argentinus – or unidentified comparable form
 †Pseudotoites transatlanticus – or unidentified comparable form
 †Pseudoxybeloceras – tentative report
  †Pteria
 †Pterophyllum
 †Pterophyllum aequale
 †Pterophyllum rajmahalense
 †Ptychoceras
 †Ptychoceras laeve – or unidentified comparable form
 †Ptyctothyris – report made of unidentified related form or using admittedly obsolete nomenclature
 †Ptyctothyris stephani
 Purpurina
 †Purpurina gravinaensis – type locality for species
  †Puzosia
 †Puzosia alaskana – type locality for species
 †Puzosigella
 †Puzosigella perrinsmithi – or unidentified comparable form
 †Puzosigella spp.
 †Puzosigella taffi – or unidentified comparable form

Q

 †Quercoidites
 †Quercoidites genustriatus

R

 †Recytella
 †Reineckeites
 †Reineckeites stuebeli – or unidentified comparable form
 †Reineckia
 †Reineckia stuebeli – or unidentified comparable form
 †Retiophyllia
 †Retiophyllia caespitosa
 †Retiophyllia clathrata – type locality for species
 †Retiophyllia dawsoni
 †Retiophyllia delicatula
 †Retiophyllia fenestrata
 †Retiophyllia frechi – or unidentified comparable form
 †Retiophyllia norica
 †Retiophyllia obtusa
 †Retiophyllia oppeli
 †Retiophyllia parviseptum
 †Retiophyllia robusta – or unidentified comparable form
 †Retiophyllia tenuicosta
 Rhombocythere
  †Rhynchonella
 †Rhynchonella blackwelderi – type locality for species

S

 †Sagenites – tentative report
  †Sagenopteris – tentative report
 †Sarla
 †Sarla vetusta
  †Saurexallopus
  †Saurornitholestes
 †Saurornitholestes langstoni
 †Saxoceras – tentative report
 †Saxoceras portlocki - or unidentified loosely related form
  †Scaphites
 †Scheffleraephyllum
 †Scheffleraephyllum venustum
 †Schizodus – tentative report
 †Schizodus appressus – or unidentified comparable form
 †Sciponoceras
  Scurria – tentative report
 †Seirocrinus
 †Seirocrinus subangularis
 †Septocardia
 †Septocardia pascoensis – or unidentified comparable form
 †Septocardia peruviana – or unidentified comparable form
 Serpula
 †Seymourites
 †Seymourites abruptus
 †Seymourites alticostatus – type locality for species
 †Seymourites gittinsi
 †Seymourites ingrahami
 †Seymourites mcevoyi
 †Seymourites multus
 †Seymourites plenus
 †Seymourites tychonis
 †Siemiradzkia – or unidentified comparable form
 †Siemiradzkia aurigera
 †Sigmopollis
 †Sigmopollis psilatus
 †Simbirskites
 †Sirenites
 †Sirenites hayesi – type locality for species
  Solecurtus – tentative report
 †Solecurtus chapmani – type locality for species
 Solemya – tentative report
 †Solenopora
 †Sonninia
 †Sonninia alaskensis – type locality for species
 †Sonninia bifurcata – type locality for species
 †Spatulites
 †Spatulites spatians – or unidentified related form
 †Sphaerocladiscites
 †Sphaerocladiscites martini – type locality for species
 †Sphaerocladiscites mendenhalli – type locality for species
 †Sphaeroidochyria – tentative report
  †Sphenobaiera
 †Sphenobaiera biloba - or unidentified loosely related form
 †Sphenobaiera czekanowskiana - or unidentified loosely related form
 †Sphenobaiera longifolia - or unidentified loosely related form
 †Spinidelphinulopsis
 †Spinidelphinulopsis whaleni
  †Spiriferina
 †Spiriferina borealis – tentative report
 †Spiriferina yukonensis – type locality for species
 †Spirocyclina – tentative report
 †Spirogmoceras
 †Spirogmoceras shastense – or unidentified comparable form
 †Spondylospira
 †Spondylospira lewesensis
  Spondylus – tentative report
 †Spongiomorpha
 †Spongiomorpha acyclica
 †Spongiomorpha gibbosa
 †Spongiomorpha ramosa
 †Steinmannites
 †Stellispongia
 †Stellispongia subsphaerica – or unidentified comparable form
 †Stenocadoceras
 †Stenocadoceras bowserense – type locality for species
 †Stenocadoceras iniskinense – type locality for species
 †Stenocadoceras multicostatum – type locality for species
 †Stenocadoceras pomeroyense – type locality for species
 †Stenocadoceras stenoloboide
 †Stenocadoceras striatum – type locality for species
 †Stenorachis
 †Stenorachis striolatus
 †Stereisporites
 †Stereisporites regium
 †Stromatomorpha
 †Stromatomorpha californica
 †Stylophyllum
 †Stylophyllum pygmaeum
 †Sunrisites – tentative report

T

 †Taeniopteris – tentative report
 †Tancredia
 †Tancredia kurupana – type locality for species
 †Tancredia stelcki
 Terebratula
  Teredolites
 †Tetragonites
 †Tetragonites glabrus
 †Tetragonites kiliani
 †Tetragonites timotheanus – or unidentified related form
 †Thallites
 †Thallites arctica - or unidentified loosely related form
 †Thamnasteria
 †Thamnasteria borealis
 †Thamnasteria smithi
 †Thecosmilia – report made of unidentified related form or using admittedly obsolete nomenclature
 Thracia
 †Thracia semiplanata
 †Thracia stelcki
 †Tosapecten – tentative report
 †Trachyceras – tentative report
 †Triassocampe
 †Triassocampe deweveri
 †Triassocypris
 †Trichites – report made of unidentified related form or using admittedly obsolete nomenclature
 †Tricolpopollenites
 †Tricolpopollenites parvulus
 †Trigonarca – or unidentified comparable form
 †Trigonarca tumida
  †Trigonia
 †Trigonodus – tentative report
 †Tritrabs
 †Tritrabs worzeli – or unidentified related form
 Trochocyathus – tentative report
  Trochus
  †Troodon
 †Troodon formosus
 †Tropites
 †Tropites stantoni – type locality for species
 †Trudopollis
 †Trudopollis meekeri
 †Trypanostylus – tentative report
 †Turanta – tentative report
 †Turanta unica – type locality for species
 Turbo – tentative report
  Turritella – tentative report
 †Tutcheria
 †Tutcheria densestriata

U

  †Ugrunaaluk – type locality for genus
 †Ugrunaaluk kuukpikensis – type locality for species
 †Unnuakomys – type locality for genus
 †Unnuakomys hutchisoni – type locality for species

V

 Vaginulina
 †Valdedorsella – tentative report
 †Valdedorsella whiteavesi – type locality for species
 †Variamusiua – tentative report
 †Vaugonia
 †Vaugonia doroschini
 †Vaugonia imlayi – type locality for species
 †Vermiceras
 †Vermiceras rursicostatum – or unidentified comparable form
 †Vinassaspongus
 †Vinassaspongus erendili
 †Vinassaspongus subsphaericus

W

 †Weyla
 †Weyla unca
 †Witchellia
 †Witchellia sutneroides – type locality for species
 †Wollemanniceras
 †Wollemanniceras alaskanum
 †Wollemanniceras fohlinense
 †Worthenia
 †Worthenia klamathensis
 †Worthenia spp.
 †Wyomingites
 †Wyomingites aplanatus

X

 †Xenoceltites
 †Xenoceltites cordilleranus
 †Xenocephalites
 †Xenocephalites hartsocki – type locality for species
 †Xenocephalites vicarius – type locality for species
 †Xenoxylon
 †Xenoxylon latiporosum

Y

 †Yezoites
 †Yezoites puerculus
 †Yezoites teshionesis

Z

 †Zetoceras
 †Zetoceras zetes – or unidentified comparable form
 †Zugmayerella
 †Zugmayerella americana
 †Zugmayerella koessensis
 †Zugmayerella ormana
 †Zugmayerella uncinata
 †Zygopleura

References

 

Mesozoic
Alaska
Alaska-related lists